"Ode to Massachusetts", words and music by Joseph Falzone, was designated the official ode of Massachusetts on November 16, 2000.

External links 
 M.G.L. 2:47, the law designating the official folk song of Massachusetts
 Secretary of the Commonwealth site (allows visitors to download the music, lyrics, and a recorded version

Massachusetts
Music of Massachusetts
Year of song missing
Songs about Massachusetts